Alen Bašić (born 20 September 1980) is a Bosnian-Herzegovinian retired defender who last played for Olimpic Sarajevo in the Premier League.

Bašić's family fled Bosnia during the war and moved to Germany where he was a part of the VfB Stuttgart youth team. When peace was restored in his native Bosnia, he returned and played at a number of clubs in the Premier League of Bosnia.

Club career
From 2004 through 2007, he returned to Germany and played for both Dynamo Dresden and Kickers Offenbach in the 2. Bundesliga before returning to FK Sarajevo and later signing with Malavan F.C. in the summer 2008 transfer window.
He moved to Malavan in summer 2008 and was one of the constant players where he played most of the season. He continued to be one of the regular players of the team in his second season.

In 2012, he signed for FK Borac Banja Luka.

Club career statistics
Last update 11 June 2010

References

External links
 German career stats – FuPa

1980 births
Living people
People from Kiseljak
Association football defenders
Bosnia and Herzegovina footballers
Bosnia and Herzegovina under-21 international footballers
FK Radnik Hadžići players
FK Sarajevo players
Dynamo Dresden players
Kickers Offenbach players
Malavan players
FK Borac Banja Luka players
FK Olimpik players
Premier League of Bosnia and Herzegovina players
2. Bundesliga players
Persian Gulf Pro League players
Bosnia and Herzegovina expatriate footballers
Expatriate footballers in Germany
Bosnia and Herzegovina expatriate sportspeople in Germany
Expatriate footballers in Iran
Bosnia and Herzegovina expatriate sportspeople in Iran